Gormania is an unincorporated community along the North Branch Potomac River in Grant County, West Virginia. Gormania lies on the Northwestern Turnpike (US 50), which crosses the North Branch into Gorman, Maryland via Gormania Bridge. It is named for United States Senator from Maryland, Arthur P. Gorman (March 11, 1839 – June 4, 1906).

Gallery

References 

Unincorporated communities in West Virginia
Unincorporated communities in Grant County, West Virginia
Populated places on the North Branch Potomac River